Hallsteinn Sigurðsson (born 1945) is an Icelandic sculptor and visual artist. He is noted for his Nordic god sculptures, some of which are located at the Laxá Power Station in the north central part of the country and are arranged in the facility’s tunnels and vaults. Some twenty five of his sculptures are exhibited in the Gufunes sculpture park in north-east Reykjavík.

Biography
Hallsteinn Sigurðsson was born in 1945 and studied at the School of Arts and Crafts in Iceland from 1963 to 1966, then went to the United Kingdom, where he studied sculpture at the Hornsey College of Art, London (1966–1967), Hammersmith College of Art, London (1967–1969) and the St. Martin’s School of Art, London (1969–1972). In London he was influenced by the work of Anthony Caro and other "New Generation" sculptors. After completing his studies in London, he made study trips to Italy, Greece and the United States.

Hallsteinn held more than a dozen solo exhibitions in the years 1971 to 1997, and has been hired to create monuments for various organizations and municipalities in Iceland. Early in his career, Hallsteinn created sculpture cast from concrete and various plastics. In his more recent works, Hallsteinn most often uses aluminium and iron alloy, generally in abstract and geometric forms. Over time his structures have become lighter in form. Dozens of his works are in public ownership, and his works are represented in the collections of museums including the Borgarness Museum, Icelandic National Gallery and Reykjavík Art Museum in Reykjavík, where he resides.  Some twenty-five of his sculptures are exhibited in the Gufunes sculpture park in northeast Reykjavík. Hallsteinn is a member of the Icelandic Sculptors Society, which he established in the Icelandic capital in 1972 along with Jon Gunnar Árnason, Ragnar Kjartansson, Þorbjörg Pálsdóttir and others. He is also a member of the Icelandic Association of Visual Artists. In 2002 a set of his sculptures based on Nordic mythology was installed in the tunnels and vaults of the Laxárvirkjun hydroelectric power station in north-central Iceland, where the works can be seen by visitors each summer. In 2006 he exhibited at the Sigurjón Ólafsson Museum with a collection named "Wheel-Plow-Wings".

Notable works

Ál-eggið -1968  
Maður og kona I – 1968
Ferningar I −1973 
Steinbarn II – 1974 
Hyrningar VIII −1975
Veðrahöll IV – 1978
Harpa −1987
Svif XXIII – 1987
Fönsun IX – 1988
Far I – 1991
Far II – 1991
Keilur V – 1991
Skeljar I −1994
Skeljar III −1994
Skeljar V −1994
Skeljar VII −1994
Fönsun XII – 1994
Pýramídar II −1994
Píramídar III −1996
Skeljar XII −1996
Veðrahöll IX – 2002
Fönsun XVI – 2004
Vængir I – 2005

References

External links
Official website

1945 births
Living people
Icelandic sculptors